In mathematics, specifically in symplectic geometry, the momentum map (or, by false etymology, moment map) is a tool associated with a Hamiltonian action of a Lie group on a symplectic manifold, used to construct conserved quantities for the action. The momentum map generalizes the classical notions of linear and angular momentum. It is an essential ingredient in various constructions of symplectic manifolds, including symplectic (Marsden–Weinstein) quotients, discussed below, and symplectic cuts and sums.

Formal definition 
Let M be a manifold with symplectic form ω. Suppose that a Lie group G acts on M via symplectomorphisms (that is, the action of each g in G preserves ω). Let  be the Lie algebra of G,  its dual, and

the pairing between the two. Any ξ in  induces a vector field ρ(ξ) on M describing the infinitesimal action of ξ. To be precise, at a point x in M the vector  is

where  is the exponential map and  denotes the G-action on M. Let  denote the contraction of this vector field with ω. Because G acts by symplectomorphisms, it follows that  is closed (for all ξ in ).

Suppose that  is not just closed but also exact, so that  for some function . Suppose also that the map  sending  is a Lie algebra homomorphism. Then a momentum map for the G-action on (M, ω) is a map  such that

The momentum map is uniquely defined up to an additive constant of integration.

A momentum map is often also required to be G-equivariant, where G acts on  via the coadjoint action. If the group is compact or semisimple, then the constant of integration can always be chosen to make the momentum map coadjoint equivariant. However, in general the coadjoint action must be modified to make the map equivariant (this is the case for example for the Euclidean group).

Hamiltonian group actions 
The definition of the momentum map requires  to be closed. In practice it is useful to make an even stronger assumption. The G-action is said to be Hamiltonian if and only if the following conditions hold. First, for every ξ in  the one-form  is exact, meaning that it equals  for some smooth function

If the action of G on (M, ω) is Hamiltonian in this sense, then a momentum map is a map  such that writing  defines a Lie algebra homomorphism  satisfying . Here  is the vector field of the Hamiltonian , defined by

Examples of momentum maps

The six components of the momentum map are then the three angular momenta and the three linear momenta.

Let  be a smooth manifold and let  be its cotangent bundle, with projection map .

The facts mentioned below may be used to generate more examples of momentum maps.

Some facts about momentum maps
Let  be Lie groups with Lie algebras , respectively.

 Let  be a coadjoint orbit. Then there exists a unique symplectic structure on  such that inclusion map  is a momentum map.
 Let  be a Hamiltonian -manifold and  a Hamiltonian -manifold. Here , where  denotes the projection map.

Symplectic quotients 
Suppose that the action of a Lie group G on the symplectic manifold (M, ω) is Hamiltonian, as defined above, with momentum map . From the Hamiltonian condition, it follows that  is invariant under G.

Thus, the quotient is a symplectic manifold, called the Marsden–Weinstein quotient, after , symplectic quotient, or symplectic reduction of M by G and is denoted . Its dimension equals the dimension of M minus twice the dimension of G.

More generally, if G does not act freely (but still properly), then  showed that  is a stratified symplectic space, i.e. a stratified space with compatible symplectic structures on the strata.

Flat connections on a surface
The space  of connections on the trivial bundle  on a surface carries an infinite dimensional symplectic form

The gauge group  acts on connections by conjugation . Identify  via the integration pairing. Then the map

that sends a connection to its curvature is a moment map for the action of the gauge group on connections. In particular the moduli space of flat connections modulo gauge equivalence  is given by symplectic reduction.

See also

 GIT quotient
 Quantization commutes with reduction.
 Poisson–Lie group
 Toric manifold
 Geometric Mechanics
 Kirwan map
 Kostant's convexity theorem

Notes

References
 J.-M. Souriau, Structure des systèmes dynamiques, Maîtrises de mathématiques, Dunod, Paris, 1970. .
 S. K. Donaldson and P. B. Kronheimer, The Geometry of Four-Manifolds, Oxford Science Publications, 1990. .
 Dusa McDuff and Dietmar Salamon, Introduction to Symplectic Topology, Oxford Science Publications, 1998. .

 

Symplectic geometry
Hamiltonian mechanics
Group actions (mathematics)